Ramón García (born 14 February 1940) is a Spanish gymnast. He competed in eight events at the 1960 Summer Olympics.

References

1940 births
Living people
Spanish male artistic gymnasts
Olympic gymnasts of Spain
Gymnasts at the 1960 Summer Olympics
Gymnasts from Madrid